Smart Girl may refer to:

 "Smart Girl" (Drake & Josh), an episode of Drake & Josh
 Smart Girl (film), a 1935 film starring Ida Lupino